Radzimowice may refer to the following places in Poland:
Radzimowice, Lower Silesian Voivodeship
Radzimowice, Masovian Voivodeship